Cornelis Marinus "Kees" Kievit (5 June 1931 – 29 July 2020) was a Dutch swimmer who won a silver medal in the 100 m backstroke event at the 1950 European Aquatics Championships. He also participated in the 1948 Summer Olympics but did not reach the finals. Between 1948 and 1951 he was 4 times national champion and set 12 national records in the 100 m and 200 m backstroke events.

References

1931 births
2020 deaths
Dutch male backstroke swimmers
Olympic swimmers of the Netherlands
Swimmers at the 1948 Summer Olympics
People from Best, Netherlands
European Aquatics Championships medalists in swimming
20th-century Dutch people
21st-century Dutch people
Sportspeople from North Brabant